Brachyrhinodon (meaning "short nose tooth") is an extinct genus of sphenodontian from the Late Triassic Lossiemouth Sandstone of Scotland. It is related to the tuatara, the only member of its order that is not extinct.

Brachyrhinodon is known from the sandstone quarries near Elgin, and is one of the Elgin Reptiles.

Sources
 Vertebrate Palaeontology by Michael J. Benton  
 In the Shadow of the Dinosaurs: Early Mesozoic Tetrapods by Nicholas C. Fraser and Hans-Dieter Sues
The Beginning of the Age of Dinosaurs: Faunal Change across the Triassic-Jurassic Boundary by Kevin Padian

Triassic lepidosaurs
Triassic reptiles of Europe
Sphenodontia
Prehistoric reptile genera